Lee Jong-suk (born 14 September 1989) is a South Korean actor and model. He debuted in 2005 as a runway model, becoming the youngest male model ever to participate in Seoul Fashion Week. Lee's breakthrough role was in School 2013 (2012). He is also well known for his roles in I Can Hear Your Voice (2013), Doctor Stranger (2014), Pinocchio (2014), W (2016), While You Were Sleeping (2017), Romance Is a Bonus Book (2019), and  Big Mouth (2022).

Education
Lee majored in Professional Motion Pictures and Art at Konkuk University and graduated from the university in 2016.

Career

2005–2010: Beginnings
At 15, Lee began his modelling career at the Seoul Collection walkway in 2005, making him the youngest male model to debut in the Seoul Collection program at Seoul Fashion Week. Since then, he has walked in a number of fashion shows.

Lee trained as an idol group member for three months, and had signed on with an agency to debut. However, he quit after the agency broke their promise of debuting him as an actor. He took part in a selection for actors at SBS TV station when he was in middle school.

In 2010, Lee made his official acting debut in the South Korean TV series Prosecutor Princess. He also made his big-screen debut in the horror movie Ghost.

2011–2013: Rising popularity and breakthrough
Lee started to gain recognition following his supporting role in the hit drama Secret Garden where he played a talented young composer with a surly attitude and a forbidden crush on the second male lead.  
In 2011, he appeared in MBC's sitcom High Kick Season 3 where he gained further popularity. Lee also co-starred in the film R2B: Return to Base in 2012, a loose remake of the critically acclaimed 1986 film Top Gun.

Lee's breakout role came as a high school student in the teen drama School 2013. He received his first acting award for the role at the 2012 KBS Drama Awards under the category Best New Actor. He also ranked fifth according to a survey entitled 'Actors Who Lit Up 2013' by Gallup Korea.

Following the success of School 2013, Lee starred in the critically acclaimed drama series I Can Hear Your Voice with Lee Bo-young. He played Park Soo-ha, an intelligent young man who can read minds. Originally slated for 16 episodes, the drama was extended by two episodes due to its successful ratings. He received the Excellence Award in the male category at the Korea Drama Awards for his performance. Lee then starred in the sports film No Breathing and had a supporting role in the box office hit The Face Reader.

2014–present: Mainstream popularity

In 2014, he starred in teen romantic comedy Hot Young Bloods, playing a cheesy womanizer. Lee then starred in hit medical drama Doctor Stranger, playing a North Korean defector who works as a doctor in South Korea. The drama was a success in China, gaining 400 million views.
Lee next starred in Pinocchio opposite actress Park Shin-hye, and played the protagonist Choi Dal-po, a first year reporter at a broadcasting company who struggles with the idea of justice and truth in a world where everyone wants to hide the facts. Pinocchio was another hit, with a reported revenue of 6.2 billion won (US$5.62 million) for broadcasting rights in just one year.
Lee's performances in the dramas Doctor Stranger and Pinocchio earned him acting accolades, including the Male Top Excellence Award at the 8th Korea Drama Awards. 
He also became the youngest actor to win the Best Actor award at the 27th Grimae Awards, chosen by television cinematographers.

Lee then embarked on an Asia fan-meeting tour, and released a photobook titled 2014-2015 Asia Tour Story ~With~, comprising photos taken of Lee's meetings with fans in seven Asian cities during the nine-month tour. Lee was also cast in his first Chinese drama entitled Jade Lovers alongside actress Zheng Shuang. The drama, filmed in Shanghai, is described as a fantasy romance series set in the 1930s. Due to Lee's success in China, a wax figure of him went on display in Hong Kong's Madame Tussauds, which the actor unveiled himself in a ceremony. 
In December 2015, Lee left his previous agency Wellmade Yedang and signed an exclusive contract with YG Entertainment on 10 May 2016. 

In July 2016, Lee returned to the Korean small screen with MBC's fantasy thriller W alongside Han Hyo-joo. The drama topped popularity charts in Korea and Lee won the Daesang (Grand Prize) at the year-end MBC Drama Awards. The same year, he co-starred in the promotional web drama First Seven Kisses for Lotte Duty Free.

In 2017, Lee starred in the crime film VIP, marking his first lead role as a villain. Lee then starred in the supernatural-procedural drama While You Were Sleeping alongside Bae Suzy in September.
In July of the same year, Lee was appointed Goodwill Ambassador for Korean tourism by the Korea Tourism Organization. The organization also released promotional videos featuring the actor, titled "8 Episodes of Korea", which focused on tourist spots in 10 different regions including Seoul, Gyeonggi, Gangwon, Jeju and Gyeongju.

In 2018, Lee was cast in the three-episode drama The Hymn of Death, a remake of the 1991 film Death Song. Lee signed with new management agency YNK Entertainment once his contract with YG Entertainment ended on 31 March 2018, but terminated his contract five months later. and established his own agency "A-man Project".

In 2019, he starred in his first romantic comedy drama Romance Is a Bonus Book alongside Lee Na-young.

In 2021, after finishing his military duty, he made a comeback with a cameo in The Witch : Part 2. The Other One. Lee later confirmed for the official film Decibel alongside Kim Rae-won, Lee Sang-hee, and Cha Eun-woo. This will be the second time Lee will appear as the villain in a movie. With VIP being the first movie he is the villain.  Later in September 2021, Lee confirmed the MBC drama Big Mouth with Im Yoon-ah, coming back three years after his discharge from the military. It will air in 2022.

In 2022, Lee held a fan meeting 'RE, JONG SUK' at the Blue Square Mastercard Hall in Seoul on 12 September.

Personal life
Lee is best friends with fellow model-actor and School 2013 co-star Kim Woo-bin, whom he has known since their modeling days. 

He was the owner of the dining cafe, 89Mansion. The cafe closed permanently on September 14, 2020 due to effects of the COVID-19 pandemic.

Relationship 
On 31 December 2022, Lee's agency confirmed his relationship with singer-actress IU. The agency on IU's side also confirmed the couple's relationship, which started four months prior to the official announcement.

Military enlistment
Lee began his mandatory military service on 8 March 2019. Lee was deemed unfit to enlist as an active duty soldier as a result of going through a car accident when he was 16 and torn his anterior cruciate ligament. Therefore, he was confirmed to work as a public service officer, and was expected to be discharged on 31 December 2020. He was finally discharged on 2 January 2021.

Philanthropy 
On 7 March 2022, Lee donated 100 million won to the Hope Bridge Disaster Relief Association to help the victims of the massive wildfire that started in Uljin, Gyeongbuk and  spread to Samcheok, Gangwon.

Filmography

Discography

Soundtrack appearances

Awards and nominations

State honors

Listicles

Notes

References

External links

Official website 

1989 births
Living people
South Korean male models
South Korean male television actors
South Korean male film actors
South Korean male web series actors
21st-century South Korean male actors
Konkuk University alumni
People from Suwon